Ricardo Rozo Ocampo (born 7 September 1969) is a Colombian former footballer and manager.

Career
Rozo began his career as a footballer, playing for Millonarios, Academia, Bogotá and Girardot. He later began coaching in women's football. He was the head coach of the Colombia women's national team at the 2011 FIFA Women's World Cup and 2012 Summer Olympics.

References

External links
 
 
 Ricardo Rozo at Soccerdonna.de 

1969 births
Living people
Footballers from Bogotá
Colombian footballers
Millonarios F.C. players
Academia F.C. players
Girardot F.C. footballers
Categoría Primera B players
Colombian football managers
Women's association football managers
Colombia women's national football team managers
2011 FIFA Women's World Cup managers
Association footballers not categorized by position